Yelunino is a rural locality (a selo) and the administrative center of Yeluninsky Selsoviet, Pavlovsky District, Altai Krai, Russia. The population was 676 as of 2013. There are 12 streets.

Geography 
Yelunino is located 14 km north of Pavlovsk (the district's administrative centre) by road. Borovikovo and Pavlovsk are the nearest rural localities.

References 

Rural localities in Pavlovsky District, Altai Krai